Stepnica is a river of Poland, a tributary of the Gowienica near Bodzęcin.

Rivers of Poland
Rivers of West Pomeranian Voivodeship